

The Weiss WM-21 Sólyom was a 1930s Hungarian light bomber and reconnaissance biplane which served in World War II and was developed by the Manfred Weiss company.

Design and development
The WM-21 was designed to replace the WM-16, which was based on the yet older Fokker C.V, and as such was considered unsuitable for operational service. The WM-21's structure was strengthened, and the aircraft received a new, more efficient wing set. A tailskid was fitted to allow for shorter landing runs on grass airfields. A conventional biplane, the Sólyom was powered by a  Weiss WM-K-14A radial engine, and had an open cockpit. A total of 128 aircraft were built by three different factories: 25 by Manfréd Weiss, 43 by MÁVAG, and 60 by MWG.

Operational history

Throughout the war, the Royal Hungarian Air Force used 48 of them for reconnaissance. They served alongside 38 Heinkel He 46s, and 37 IMAM Ro.37s, supplemented by 13 Heinkel He 111s. They first entered service in 1939 with short-range reconnaissance units. Although they were active during the 1940 dispute with Romania, their first active operational use was during the Axis invasion of Yugoslavia in April 1941. 

During the invasion of Yugoslavia, none of the WM-21s were lost in combat, but one was lost in an accident. From June 1941 they were used to support Hungarian Army units in Ukraine, and then against Soviet partisans. They lost another WM-21 on June 29, when the war against the Soviet Union was intensifying. Around 80 aircraft were also transferred to duties as trainers, as they were removed from operational use, until 1945.

Operators

Royal Hungarian Air Force

Specifications

See also

References

Notes

Bibliography

1930s Hungarian military reconnaissance aircraft
Weiss Manfred aircraft
Biplanes
Single-engined tractor aircraft
Aircraft first flown in 1937